Samuel Legerwood Patterson (March 6, 1850 – September 14, 1908) was a North Carolina politician and farmer.

Biography
The son of Samuel F. Patterson and his wife, Phoebe Caroline, Patterson was born in 1850 at Palmyra, the family plantation in Caldwell County, North Carolina.

He served in the state House of Representatives in 1891 and 1899 and in the North Carolina Senate in 1893. In the legislature, he was chair of the committee on agriculture. He was also a trustee of the University of North Carolina at Chapel Hill. Patterson was appointed commissioner of agriculture from 1895 to 1897, when he was removed by the fusion of Republicans and Populists that came to power that year. He was reappointed in 1899 and then became the first popularly elected commissioner in 1900. He served until his death on September 14, 1908. Patterson Hall at North Carolina State University is named in his honor. He and his wife bequeathed Palmyra to the Episcopal Church as a school, which operated as The Patterson School from 1909 through 2009.

References

Inventory of the Jones and Patterson Family Papers
Patterson School closed for 2009-2010 school year
Patterson Hall is 100 years old

North Carolina Commissioners of Agriculture
1850 births
1908 deaths
People from Caldwell County, North Carolina
Members of the North Carolina House of Representatives
North Carolina state senators
19th-century American politicians